Barb Wire is a 1996 American superhero film based on the Barb Wire comic book series by Dark Horse. It was directed by David Hogan, produced by Brad Wyman, and written by Chuck Pfarrer and Ilene Chaiken. The film stars Pamela Anderson in the titular role, alongside Temuera Morrison, Victoria Rowell, Xander Berkeley, Udo Kier, and Steve Railsback. Although Barb Wire was panned by critics, it has attracted a cult following.

Plot
In 2017, during the Second American Civil War, Barb Wire owns the Hammerhead, a nightclub in Steel Harbor, "the last free city" in a United States ravaged by the war. She earns cash as a mercenary and bounty hunter. Chief of Police Willis raids her club. Willis's target is fugitive Dr. Corrina 'Cora D' Devonshire, a former government scientist with information about a new bioweapon called Red Ribbon being developed by her former superiors in the Congressional Directorate. The Congressional Council has tasked Colonel Victor Pryzer with finding Dr. Devonshire so they can end the Second Civil War by releasing the virus on the United Front territories. Dr. Devonshire hopes to escape to Canada to make this information public.

Devonshire turns up at the Hammerhead. She is accompanied by Axel Hood, a "freedom fighter" Barb had loved at the outbreak of the war. The two were separated during the conflict. Axel tries to help Cora get to Canada. They try to find a contraband pair of contact lenses that would allow Cora to evade the retinal scan identification at the Steel Harbor airport. The lenses pass through the hands of several lowlifes before also ending up at Barb's nightclub.

Rather than give the lenses to Cora and Axel, Barb makes a deal with 'Big Fatso', the leader of a junkyard gang: Fatso wants the lenses, which are worth a fortune on the black market, and Barb wants a million dollars and an armed escort to the airport, where she plans to get on the plane to Canada. But Fatso double-crosses Barb; when Barb, Axel and Cora show up at the junkyard to make the swap, Colonel Pryzer and his storm troopers are also there, along with Chief of Police Willis. Willis makes a show of arresting Barb and Cora, but instead of putting handcuffs on Barb, he slips her a hand grenade. Barb uses the grenade to kill Fatso and cause enough confusion to allow Barb, Axel, Cora and Willis to pile into Barb's armored van and lead the Congressionals on a car chase, culminating in a hand-to-hand fight between Barb and Colonel Pryzer on a forklift suspended by crane above the harbor. Pryzer falls to his death while Barb escapes.

The party makes it to the airport, where Barb reveals she still has the contact lenses. She gives them to Cora, and Cora and Axel get on the plane to Canada while Willis and Barb remain on the rainswept tarmac.

Cast

 Pamela Anderson Lee as Barbara "Barb Wire" Kopetski
 Temuera Morrison as Axel Hood
 Victoria Rowell as Dr. Corrina "Cora D" Devonshire
 Jack Noseworthy as Charlie Kopetski 
 Xander Berkeley as Chief Alexander Willis
 Udo Kier as "Curly"
 Steve Railsback as Colonel Victor Pryzer
 Mary Anna Reyes as Woman In Torture Room
 Andre Rosey Brown as "Big Fatso"
 Nicholas Worth as Ruben Tannenbaum
 Clint Howard as Schmitz
 Nils Allen Stewart as Jack
 Henry Kingi as Moe
 Mark Collver as Manny
 Jennifer Banko as "Spike"
 Loren Rubin as Willie Krebs
 Peewee Piemonte as Officer Frick
 Dominiquie Vandenberg as Officer Frack
 Tony Bill as Foster
 Michael Russo as Mr. Santos
 Shelly Desai as Sharif
 Marshall Manesh as Sheik
 John Paxton as "Smooth"
 Neil Hunt as "Weasel"
 Ken Fosgren as "Greaseball"
 Tom Lister Jr. as Bouncer
 Teo as Disc Jockey
 Ai Wan as "China"
 Diane Warshay as Maria
 Candace Kita as Dancer
 Diane Shay as Stripper In Dressing Room
 Adriana Alexander as Redhead

Production
Barb Wire was directed by David Hogan, the second-unit director on Alien 3 and Batman Forever. The film had a production budget of $9 million. Anderson did some of her own stunts, despite her fear of heights. The fact that she had to wear high heels and a corset that made her waist 17 inches made fight scenes challenging.

Music
A soundtrack album, also titled Barb Wire, was released in 1996.

Reception

Box office
Barb Wire failed at the box-office, grossing less than $3.8 million in the United States.

Critical response
Barb Wire was panned by critics. Roger Ebert pointed out that the film's plot was identical to that of Casablanca and derided the low-brow attempts at sensuality, but praised the cast and crew's approach to the material: "The filmmakers must have known they were not making a good movie, but they didn't use that as an excuse to be boring and lazy. Barb Wire has a high energy level, and a sense of deranged fun". He gave it two and a half stars. Similarly to Ebert, Owen Gleiberman of Entertainment Weekly commented on the film's aping of the Casablanca plot and its "teasing, hollow 'naughtiness'", but further said that the film is lacking in energy. He gave it a C. Janet Maslin of The New York Times criticized Anderson's performance, comparing her to Barbie and Barbarella.

Barb Wire holds a 28% approval rating on Rotten Tomatoes based on 36 reviews (10 positive, 27 negative), with the consensus stating that "Barb Wire could've been fun camp, but Pamela Anderson can't deliver her lines with any dramatic or comedic impact". The film was ranked in the bottom 20 of the Stinkers' "100 Years, 100 Stinkers" list, which noted the 100 worst movies of the 20th century, at #19. Since its release, Barb Wire has attracted a cult following.

Awards and nominations

Adaptations
GT Interactive announced that they would be publishing a video game based on the film for the PlayStation, Saturn, PC, and Macintosh in January 1997. The developer was Cryo Interactive. The gameplay was said to be similar to Resident Evil, with a single-player campaign and a two-player deathmatch mode. It was never released.

A 48-page comic book adaptation was published by Dark Horse Comics on May 1, 1996.

References

External links
 
 
 
 
 Sci-Fi Universe article from May 1996 at PamWatch.com

1996 films
1996 directorial debut films
1990s English-language films
1990s science fiction action films
1990s superhero films
American science fiction action films
American dystopian films
1990s feminist films
Films set in 2017
Films set in the future
Girls with guns films
PolyGram Filmed Entertainment films
Dark Horse Entertainment films
Gramercy Pictures films
Golden Raspberry Award winning films
Live-action films based on comics
Films based on Dark Horse Comics
Films scored by Michel Colombier
Superheroine films
Second American Civil War speculative fiction
1990s American films